NA-62 Gujrat-I is a constituency for the National Assembly of Pakistan.

Members of Parliament

2018-2022: NA-71 Gujrat-IV

Election 2002 

General elections were held on 10 Oct 2002. Rehman Naseer Chaudhry of PPP won by 52,484 votes.

Election 2008 

General elections were held on 18 Feb 2008. Muhammad Jamil Malik of PML-N won by 75,205 votes.

Election 2013 

General elections were held on 11 May 2013. Chaudhry Abid Raza of PML-N won by 94,196 votes and became the  member of National Assembly.

Election 2018 
General elections were held on 25 July 2018.

See also
NA-61 Jhelum-II
NA-63 Gujrat-II

References

External links 
Election result's official website
Delimitation 2018 official website Election Commission of Pakistan

71
71